Od neba do neba (English: From Heaven to Heaven) is the ninth studio album by the Bosnian heavy metal band Divlje jagode, released in 2003.

Track listing

Personnel
 Pero Galić – lead vocals
 Sead Lipovača – guitar
 Dejan Orešković – bass
 Thomas Balaž – drums

External links

Divlje jagode albums
2003 albums